Bandler is a surname. Notable people with the surname include:

Faith Bandler, AC (1918–2015), aka Ida Lessing Faith Mussing, Australian civil rights activist of South Sea Islander heritage
John Bandler (born 1941), professor, engineer, entrepreneur, artist, speaker, playwright, and author of fiction and nonfiction
Richard Bandler (born 1950), American author and trainer in the field of self-help
Vivica Bandler (1917–2004), Finnish theater director and agronomist

See also
Brandler